Into the Bloodstream is the sixth studio album by Australian singer songwriter Archie Roach. The album was released on 19 October 2012 and peaked at number 49 on the ARIA Charts in December 2012.

The album deals with Roach losing his life partner Ruby Hunter in February 2010, and his own health issues including having a stroke, being diagnosed with cancer and having half a lung removed. In the liner notes, Roach says the album is "built on pain." Roach says "Pain can also bring about change in one's life for the better, we can choose to ignore the Pain until it becomes unbearable or we can do something. I used to think that letting go of the pain was the only way of getting better but that may not be necessarily so. You see some events in my life I will never ever truly get over and the pain will always be there, but I can do something about [it]." Upon release Roach added "The songs I think are uplifting, about getting on with life. Music has played a big part in getting better. It's a little different from what people have been used to from me but the songs have been really well-received."

At the ARIA Music Awards of 2013, the album was nominated for ARIA Award for Best Blues and Roots Album.

At the Deadly Awards 2013, the album won Album Release of the Year.

Reception
Into the Bloodstream was met with critical acclaim and was described as "an inspirational comeback" by Mess & Noise, "a triumphant return" by ABC online and "amongst his best work" by The AU Review.
Michael Dwyer from Sydney Morning Herald described the album as having songs "from bereavement and illness to reaffirmation of belonging and creativity."

Deadly Magazine said "Each track on the album is a mix of expressing pain, and standing strong." and "As always, Archie's lyrics take us to where he wants us to go – to the voice of his people, the land and the spirit and the ever-present struggle of Indigenous people in this country." adding "A major theme of the album is the support that Archie offers to anyone experiencing pain and loss."

Track listing

Charts

Release history

References

2012 albums
Archie Roach albums
Liberation Records albums